Beşağaç is a village in the Beytüşşebap District of Şırnak Province in Turkey. The village is populated by Kurds of non-tribal affiliation and had a population of 318 in 2021.

The hamlet of Altınsu is attached to Beşağaç.

References 

Villages in Beytüşşebap District
Kurdish settlements in Şırnak Province